Moran Mor Ignatius Peter IV (1798 – 8 October 1894), also known as Ignatius Peter III,  was the Patriarch of Antioch,  and head of the Syriac Orthodox Church from 1872 until his death in 1894. He is regarded by many as the architect of the modern church.

Early life
Peter was born in the city of Mosul in 1798 into a well known Christian family and spent his childhood at the Monastery of Mor Hananyo, where he would later become a monk and also be ordained as a priest. In 1846, Peter was ordained metropolitan bishop of Damascus by the Patriarch Ignatius Elias II and adopted the name Julius.

Metropolitan Bishop
As metropolitan, Peter engaged and succeeded in a dispute with the Syriac Catholic Church over ownership of various ancient churches and monasteries within his diocese and as a result recovered many for the Syriac Orthodox Church.

On 2 June 1866, Peter allegedly consecrated the French Presbyterian minister Jules Ferrette as Bishop of Iona, giving him a mission to introduce Oriental Orthodoxy to the West. No original document of this alleged consecration is known to exist; Ferrette published what he claimed was an English translation of his Syrian consecration document after he arrived in London.

At the time of Ignatius Jacob II's death, in 1871, Peter was staying in Constantinople and could not travel to Mardin for the patriarchal election. However, the synod unanimously elected him as patriarch. At first he declined the position, but under continuous persuasion Peter was consecrated Patriarch on 16 June 1872 at the Monastery of Mor Hananyo, upon which he assumed the Patriarchal name Ignatius.

Patriarch of Antioch
Soon after he became patriarch, Peter renovated the Monastery of Mor Hananyo and ordained Rabban Abded Sattuf as Metropolitan of Jerusalem under the name Gregorius. In 1873, he moved to Constantinople where he was recognised by the Ottoman government as the official Syriac Orthodox Patriarch and received the appropriate rights.

Church in India
Whilst staying at Constantinople, the Patriarch received a letter from Pulikottil Mor Dionysius and Edavazikkal Philipose Corepiscopos seeking help resolving problems caused by the Metropolitan Athanasius, who had already been suspended by both Ignatius Elias II and Ignatius Jacob II for carrying out an Anglican reformation of the Malankara Syrian Church.

After consulting with various metropolitans, the Patriarch and metropolitan Mor Gregorius Abded Sattuf of Jerusalem left Constantinople on 24 August 1874 for Britain to discuss the issue with the British government. Arriving in September, they met with the British government officials and appealed to the Marquess of Salisbury, the Secretary of State for India at the time. Peter was at first received with hostility from Archibald Campbell Tait, the Archbishop of Canterbury, who had received word from Protestant bishops in India that Athanasius deserved the support of the Church of England.

However, the Patriarch impressed the British public with his knowledge of the Bible and as a result held audience with Queen Victoria and the British Government asked the governor of Madras Presidency to consider his cause. Also, whilst staying in Britain, Peter arranged for a printing press to be sent to the Monastery of Mor Hananyo. In April 1875, the Patriarch and the metropolitan sailed to India via Egypt and reached Bombay in May. They met Pulikottil Mor Dionysius in June at the city of Pune and travelled from there to Madras to meet the governor to convince him of their cause. After meeting with the governor, he agreed to help him and the Patriarch soon left for Malabar again.

In March 1876, the Kingdom of Travancore revoked state sponsorship of the CMS and a decree was issued disavowing the state's right to interfere in the affairs of the church. In July, the Patriarch convened the first Mulanthuruthy Synod which made many organisational and administrative decisions. The major arrangements were:
 Formation of 'Malankara Syrian Christian Association Committee' a representative body for the Malankara Syrian Church and consisting of 24 elected members thus introducing a democratic set up of administration.
 Division of Malankara Church into six archdioceses and ordination of a metropolitan for each archdiocese.

Return to Syria
In May 1877, the Patriarch left India and visited the churches of Egypt before arriving in Jerusalem and travelled to Constantinople where he established a new church in the name of the Virgin Mary. He later returned to the Monastery of Mor Hananyo where he would reside for his remaining years. The Patriarch died on 8 October 1894 whilst at Mardin and was buried at Beth Qadishe.

References

Peter 4
1894 deaths
1798 births
19th-century people from the Ottoman Empire
People from Mosul
Assyrians from the Ottoman Empire
19th-century Oriental Orthodox archbishops
18th-century people from the Ottoman Empire
Oriental Orthodox bishops in the Ottoman Empire